Georg John (born Georg Jacobsohn; 23 July 1879 – 18 November 1941) was a German stage and film actor.

Early life 
Georg Jacobsohn was born into a Jewish household in Schmiegel, Province of Posen, Imperial Germany.

Career 
John began his career around 1900 in smaller stages and traveling theatres. In 1904, he was engaged at the Theater of Wilhelmshaven, followed by appearances at Stolp in 1905, Altona, Mülheim an der Ruhr, Bochum and Göttingen. In 1914, John worked as an actor and producer for Vaterländische Schauspiele in Vienna.

In 1917, John first appeared in silent movies, playing a Tibetan monk in Die Fremde (The Stranger), and Death in Hilde Warren und der Tod (Hilde Warren and Death). These roles were typical of the kinds of parts he would become known for, even if, at first, he was more often seen as a father, husband or dignitary. Beginning in the 1920s, John appeared in the films of notable German filmmakers, where he often played bizarre, gnome-like figures, such as the beggar in Fritz Lang's Der müde Tod (Tired Death, 1921, released in English as Destiny), and the blind balloon-seller who recognizes the murderer due to a whistled song in 1931's M. For F. W. Murnau he played a night-watchman in Der Letzte Mann (The Last Man, 1924, released in English as The Last Laugh).

Being a Jew, John was deported in autumn 1941 to the Łódź Ghetto where he died on 18 November 1941 at the age of 62.

Selected filmography 

 Ramara (1916)
 Hilde Warren und der Tod (1917) – Tod
 Die Fremde (1917)
 Das Buch des Lasters (1917) – Bildhauer
 Waves of Fate (1918)
 Mr. Wu (1918) – Tschang-Ta
 Verlorene Töchter (1918) – Manager Pichler
 Veritas Vincit (1919) – Blinder Senator
 Peer Gynt (1919, part 1, 2) – Prof. Dr. Begriffenfeldt
 The Boy in Blue (1919) – Zigeunerhauptmann / Gypsy commander
 The Spiders (1919–1920, part 1, 2) – Dr. Telphas
 Unheimliche Geschichten (1919)
 Harakiri (1919) – Buddhist Monk
 Phantome des Lebens (1919)
 Der Weg der Grete Lessen (1919, Short)
 Dämon der Welt (1920, part 2, 3) – Fred Osring
 Der Menschheit Anwalt (1920) – Hexenrichter Abdonatus / Hexenrichter Lucinder
 Johann Baptiste Lingg (1920) – Gutsverwalter Wolleck
 The Legend of Holy Simplicity (1920) – Blinder Bettler
 Der König von Paris (1920, part 1, 2)
 Humanity Unleashed (1920) – Fritz Breese
 Schatten einer Stunde (1920)
 Napoleon and the Little Washerwoman (1920)
 Hearts are Trumps (1920) – Dunkler mann
 Planetenschieber (1921)
 Tobias Buntschuh – Das Drama eines Einsamen (1921) – Abgesandte des Stahltrusts
 The Stranger from Alster Street (1921)
 Die Geschichte von Barak Johnson (1921)
 Der Silberkönig (1921, part 1-4)
 Der müde Tod (1921) – Beggar / Bettler
 The Riddle of the Sphinx (1921) – Mummy
 Lady Hamilton (1921) – zwei Jacobiner
 The Indian Tomb (1921, part 1, 2) – Büßer / a Penitent
 Das Geheimnis der Santa Maria (1921)
 Das Geheimnis der sechs Spielkarten (1921, part 4)
 Die Geschichte des grauen Hauses 1 – Episode: Der Mord aus verschmähter Liebe (1921)
 The Adventurer (1922) – der rote Johnny
 Die Beute der Erinnyen (1922) – Tom Sprang
 Der brennende Acker (1922) – Großknecht / Head farmhand
 Dr. Mabuse, der Spieler (1922) – Pesch
 She and the Three (1922) – Ehrenmann hinter schwedischen Gardinen
 Prashna's Secret (1922) – Praschna, indischer Fakir
 The Fall of Jerusalem (1922) – Egyptian Emmissary
 Marie Antoinette, the Love of a King (1922) – Robespierre
 The Fire Ship (1922)
 The Stone Rider (1923) – Pförtner
 A Woman, an Animal, a Diamond (1923) – Zirkusdirektor
 The Lost Shoe (1923) – Jon
 I Had a Comrade (1923) – Marodeur
 The Good Comrade (1923) – Marodeur
 Gold and Luck (1923) – Wucherer
 Frauenschicksal (1924)
 Die Nibelungen (1924) – Mime the blacksmith / Alberich the Nibelung / Slaodel, his brother
 Decameron Nights (1924) – Astologer
 My Leopold (1924) – Nibisch
 Das Wachsfigurenkabinett (Waxworks) (1924) – Prisoner
 The Last Laugh (1924) – Nachtwächter [Night Watchman]
 Peter the Pirate (1925) – Beppo
 Harry Hill's Deadly Hunt (1925, part 1, 2)
 Guillotine (1925)
 Express Train of Love (1925)
 Slums of Berlin (1925) – Laundress's Husband
 The Gentleman Without a Residence (1925) – Fürst
 Varieté (1925) – Seeman
 Bismarck (1925, part 1)
 The Hanseatics (1925)
 Adventure on the Night Express (1925) – Theewens Diener Raoul
 The Fallen (1926) – Schampuspusorje
 The Mill at Sanssouci (1926) – General Zieten
 Des Königs Befehl (1926)
 Eyes Open, Harry! (1926) – Nathan Miller
 Das graue Haus (1926) – Der Henker
 Hell of Love (1926) – Heinicke, Prokurist
 The Flight in the Night (1926) – Bediensteter
 Wenn Menschen irren. Frauen auf Irrwegen (1926)
 Metropolis (1927) – Arbeiter / Working Man Who Causes Explosion of M-Machine (uncredited)
 Erinnerungen einer Nonne (1927)
 The Bordellos of Algiers (1927) – Portier
 The Weavers (1927) – Ansorge
 Frühere Verhältnisse (1927)
 Gehetzte Frauen (1927)
 The Curse of Vererbung (1927) – Portier
 At the Edge of the World (1927)
 Der Mann ohne Kopf (1927) – Der Schreckliche
 Petronella – Das Geheimnis der Berge (1927) – Der alte Amros
 Only a Viennese Woman Kisses Like That (1928) – Der Manager
 Alraune (1928) – Der Mörder
 Luther (1928) – Ein Krüppel
 Panic (1928)
 Spione (1928) – Locomotive Engineer (uncredited)
 Man Against Man (1928) – Zamok
 The Hangman (1928)
 Volga Volga (1928)
 Anastasia, die falsche Zarentochter (1928)
 Somnambul (1929) – Der Wirt
 Taxi at Midnight (1929) – Dritter Wachtmeister
 Men Without Work (1929) – Odysseus – der 'Künstler
 Andreas Hofer (1929) – Franz Raffl – ein Bauer
 Atlantik (1929) – Wendt, Thomas' servant
 The Woman Without Nerves (1930) – Sekretär
 Fundvogel (1930) – Poacher
 Rag Ball (1930)
 The Land of Smiles (1930) – Tschang in der Operette
 The Flute Concert of Sanssouci (1930) – Zieten
 Danton (1931) – Ankläger
 Stürmisch die Nacht (1931)
 M (1931) – Blind Panhandler
 The First Right of the Child (1932)
 Death Over Shanghai (1932) – Lutsin – Praxas Diener
 F.P.1 antwortet nicht (1932) – Maschinist
 The Flower of Hawaii (1933) – Oberpriester von Hawaii
 Jumping Into the Abyss (1933) – Fotograf
 The Testament of Dr. Mabuse (1933) – Baums Diener / Baum's Servant (final film role)

References

External links 

Photos

1879 births
1941 deaths
People from Śmigiel
German Jews who died in the Holocaust
Jewish German male actors
German male film actors
German male silent film actors
German male stage actors
People from the Province of Posen
People who died in the Łódź Ghetto
German civilians killed in World War II
19th-century German male actors
20th-century German male actors